Wismoyo Widhistio (born November 30, 1991) is an Indonesian footballer that currently plays for Gresik United. He previously also plays for Gresik United U-21.

External links 
 

1991 births
Living people
Indonesian footballers
Gresik United players
Association football defenders
People from Gresik Regency
Sportspeople from East Java